The 2013 Open Seguros Bolívar was a professional tennis tournament played on clay courts. It was the ninth edition of the tournament which was part of the 2013 ATP Challenger Tour. It took place in Bogotá, Colombia between 4 and 10 November 2013.

Singles main-draw entrants

Seeds

 1 Rankings are as of October 28, 2013.

Other entrants
The following players received wildcards into the singles main draw:
  Nicolás Barrientos
  Juan Sebastián Cabal
  Carlos Salamanca
  Horacio Zeballos

The following players received entry from the qualifying draw:
  Ariel Behar
  Juan Ignacio Londero
  Jonas Luetjen
  Gianluigi Quinzi

The following player entered the singles main draw as a lucky loser:
  Pedro Sousa

Champions

Singles

 Víctor Estrella Burgos def.  Thomaz Bellucci 6–2, 3–0 retired

Doubles

 Juan Sebastián Cabal /  Alejandro González def.  Nicolás Barrientos /  Eduardo Struvay 6–3, 6–2

External links
Official Website

Open Seguros Bolivar
Seguros Bolívar Open Bogotá
2013 in Colombian tennis